Krum High School is a public high school located in the city of Krum, Texas, USA and classified as a 4A school by the UIL.  It is a part of the Krum Independent School District located in west central Denton County.   In 2015, the school was rated "Met Standard" by the Texas Education Agency.

In addition to Krum, the school's boundary includes a portion of Denton.

Academics
The high school excels in UIL academic competitions, with six individuals advancing to the state meet in 2007.

Athletics
The Krum Bobcats compete in these sports 

Cross Country, Volleyball, Football, Basketball, Powerlifting, Golf, Tennis, Track, Softball & Baseball

Addition of football
Unusual for high schools in high-school football crazy Texas, Krum did not participate in football until 2010.  In 2006, Krum ISD voters defeated by a 53-vote margin a $6 million bond issue that would have added a football stadium to the school and football as an extracurricular activity for the first time since 1922.   In November 2007, voters passed a $7.5 million bond package to add facilities for football and girls' volleyball.  The district began to offer these sports during the 2008-09 school year.

State Titles
Boys' Basketball - 
1971(B), 1978(B), 1994(2A), 1996(2A), 1998(2A)
Boys' Cross Country - 
2003(2A)
Girls' Cross Country - 
2001(2A), 2002(2A)
Girls' Softball 
2017(4A)
The boys' basketball team shares the state record for championships in its classification.

References

External links
Krum ISD

High schools in Denton County, Texas
Public high schools in Texas